Richard Alexander Fullerton Penrose Jr. (December 17, 1863 – July 31, 1931), better known throughout his career as R. A. F. Penrose Jr., was an American mining geologist and entrepreneur.

He was from a prominent Philadelphia family of Cornish descent. His brothers were U.S. senator Boies Penrose, mining engineer Spencer Penrose, and gynecologist Charles Bingham Penrose, and his grandfather was U.S. politician Charles B. Penrose.

Penrose graduated in 1885 with a Ph.D. from Harvard for work on phosphates. Later, he performed geological surveys in Texas and Arkansas until 1892, and then traveled the country as a mining surveyor. Most notable was his survey of Cripple Creek, Colorado, for the U.S. Geological Survey.  Penrose refrained from purchasing or investing in mines in the Cripple Creek area because of what he saw as his ethical responsibility as a USGS employee, but did purchase and invest in mines elsewhere, including silver and copper mines in Arizona.

In 1903 his brothers and father were investors who formed the Utah Copper Company.

After his father died in 1908, Penrose made a complete career change, using his knowledge as a mining geologist to succeed as a mining investor and as an entrepreneur in other areas as well. Having amassed considerable wealth in these efforts, Penrose established the Penrose Medal of the Geological Society of America (GSA) in 1927. Penrose was very active in GSA: he was elected as a Member of GSA in 1889, served on GSA Council from 1914 to 1916, was GSA vice president in 1919, a member of the Finance Committee from 1924 to 1929, and GSA president in 1930. Upon his death in 1931, he left a generous bequest to GSA, with the remainder of his estate after more minor bequests divided equally between the Geological Society of America and the American Philosophical Society of Philadelphia: nearly $4 million went to each society (approximately equivalent to $ million in ). The Penrose bequest serves to support the research grants program of the Geological Society of America. Penrose was President of the Academy of Natural Sciences of Philadelphia 1922-1926.

Together with Dr. Francis West Lewis and Dr. T. Hewson Bache he founded the Children's Hospital of Philadelphia.

Penrose was inducted into the US National Mining Hall of Fame in 2006.

See also
Penrose Medal
Penrose Gold Medal
Daniel Barringer (geologist)

References

Eckel, Edwin B., editor, 1982, The Geological Society of America—Life History of a Learned Society: Boulder, Colorado, Geological Society of America Memoir 155, p. 14-24.
Helen R. Fairbanks and Charles P. Berkey, Life and Letters of R. A. F. Penrose Jr.
Penrose's relation to the GSA
Cross and Penrose Rock Collection at Cripple Creek
Texas Geological Survey by R.A.F. Penrose
A Directory of Selected Awards and Medals for the Geosciences (MS Word document, 153 Kb)
GSA Benefactor Inducted into National Mining Hall of Fame
Geological Society of America – Grants at www.geosociety.org

1863 births
1931 deaths
Harvard University alumni
American geologists
Businesspeople from Philadelphia
United States Geological Survey personnel
American people of Cornish descent
American founders
Economic geologists
Presidents of the Geological Society of America